Langham Pond is a  biological Site of Special Scientific Interest north of Egham in Surrey.

The pond and its surrounding alluvial meadows on chalk represent a habitat unique in southern England. The pond is the remains of an oxbow lake, formed when a meander of the River Thames was bypassed. The pond contains all four British duckweeds, three nationally scarce plants and a species of fly which has been found nowhere else in Britain, Cerodontha ornata.

References

External links
Surrey County Council map of SSSIs

Sites of Special Scientific Interest in Surrey